Hottelstedt is a former municipality in the Weimarer Land district of Thuringia, Germany. Since 1 December 2007, it has been part of the municipality Berlstedt, which merged into the town Am Ettersberg on 1 January 2019.

Former municipalities in Thuringia
Grand Duchy of Saxe-Weimar-Eisenach